Roel André Ophoff (born 30 March 1970) is a Dutch human geneticist who is Professor of Psychiatry and Human Genetics in the David Geffen School of Medicine at the University of California, Los Angeles. He received his PhD in human genetics from Leiden University with a dissertation entitled "The molecular basis of familial hemiplegic migraine".

References

External links
Faculty page

Living people
1970 births
People from Zwolle
Dutch geneticists
Human geneticists
David Geffen School of Medicine at UCLA faculty
Leiden University alumni
Psychiatric geneticists